Gunnarstorp was a locality situated in Bjuv Municipality, Skåne County, the most southerly province in Sweden.

There were 401 inhabitants in 2010, up from 360 five years earlier. By 2015 it merged with Bjuv and lost its status as a separate locality.

The town grew up around a mine that was sunk in 1910 and worked between 1913 and 1946.

References 

Populated places in Skåne County
Populated places in Bjuv Municipality